Ganboldyn Bilgüün is a Mongolian footballer who plays as a defender for Mongolian Premier League club Erchim. He made his first appearance for the Mongolia national football team in 2013.

References

Mongolian footballers
Erchim players
Living people
Association football defenders
1983 births
Mongolia international footballers